Jana Juřenčáková (born 29 October 1962) is a Czech politician and economist. An independent, supported by Mayors and Independents, Juřenčáková became Senator for Zlín as a result of the 2006 Czech Senate election, ahead of incumbent Jiří Stodůlka. After running for re-election in 2012, she finished fourth in the first round of voting, eventually being replaced by Tomio Okamura.

References

External links
 www.jurencakova.cz – Official website 

1962 births
Members of the Senate of the Czech Republic
20th-century Czech economists
Czech women economists
Prague University of Economics and Business alumni
Living people
Czechoslovak economists
21st-century Czech economists
People from Slavičín